VIP Television (commonly shortened to VIP TV) is an entertainment news magazine program that covers red carpet events, charity events, sports, trends, and celebrities in South Florida.

The program airs on The CW (WTVX and WSFL-TV), Tuff TV, and MundoMax/WGEN-TV in the Miami-Fort Lauderdale, West Palm Beach-Ft. Pierce, and Key West television markets.

History 
A 22-minute pilot episode of VIP TV was broadcast nationwide on satellite television on October 29, 2010 and featured current hosts Jayquan and Ana Maria Reyes, as well as interviews with UFC fighter Spencer Fisher and Fat Joe. Unlike the present iteration of the show, the pilot was filmed in a North Beach studio and primarily focused on fashion and parties in Miami's South Beach neighborhood.

VIP TV first aired in its current 30-minute, commercial-less format on WPLG Channel 10, the Miami-Fort Lauderdale ABC affiliate, in 2012.

On August 15, 2015, the program held the first annual VIP TV Model Search to benefit No More Tears, a charity for victims of human trafficking and domestic violence. The event was hosted by actor Evan Golden and was judged by record producer Scott Storch, Miss Universe Canada Chanel Beckenlehner, and Ms. United States Celine Pelofi.

On-air cast 
 Kavita Channe – Host
 Christine Curran – Host
 Natalia De La Cruz – Host
 Jayquan – Host
 Jennifer Riley – Host
 Charelle Sno – Host

References 

2010s American television news shows
Entertainment news shows in the United States
English-language television shows
Spanish-language television shows
MundoMax original programming